Macrobrachium agwi is a species of freshwater shrimp, first described in 2008,  endemic to the Himalaya. It was discovered when a shipment of ornamental prawns, destined for the aquarium trade, was shipped from Cooch Behar, West Bengal, India to Europe. Examination of the shipment showed that one type of shrimp was a new, undescribed species.

References

External links

Palaemonidae
Freshwater crustaceans of Asia
Crustaceans described in 2008